Pavan English Medium High School is a school in Dharwad, India running under Mitra Education Society. It was awarded the Bala Vikas Ratna Award for Growth for the 2008–09 school year by the Government of India.

The Management bodies of the institution include Retd. Prof. B.R.Patil (PRESIDENT), Smt. Ratna Shankargouda Patil (Vice President), Late Shankargouda Patil (former Secretary) and other directors under the name "Mitra Education Society".

The school was started in 1988. The school has successfully branched into two more new wings which are PAVAN CENTRAL PUBLIC SCHOOL(CBSE AFFILIATION AND PAVAN INTERNATIONAL SCHOOL (ICSE AND CAMBRIDGE Structured Pre-School).

The location of the school shifted from U.B. HILL to Barakotri, Karnataka University Road in 2005.

The school is involved in sports such as Cricket, Throwball, Skating, Karate, Volleyball, Basketball and other games.

References

Schools in Dharwad district
Educational institutions established in 1988
1988 establishments in Karnataka